Hagibis (Filipino word meaning "velocity", "speed" or 'swiftness") is a Filipino disco group best known for their macho image, on-stage costumes, and macho songs about women. Originally formed by Juan dela Cruz Band singer and bassist Mike Hanopol and Vic del Rosario, they are cited as the "First Boyband in the Philippines" and later were coined the title "Village People of the Philippines", a title they still hold to this day. Their original line-up were composed of Sonny Parsons, Bernie Fineza, Mike Respall, Joji Garcia and Mon Picazo.

History
According to Mike Hanopol, who composed almost all of Hagibis' tracks, Vic del Rosario wanted to recruit famous actors and singers for the new group; but later changed his mind, and instead, they recruited unknown musicians. Hanopol also revealed in the same interview that he also sung the band's recorded songs himself. Parsons also said during Hagibis' guest appearance on Tonight with Arnold Clavio, that he originally auditioned for VST & Co. before joining Hagibis. The group borrowed some elements of the American disco group, Village People, such the line dancing, the leather clothing, accompany with motorcycles.

In 1980, the film Dolphy's Angels was released. In it Hagibis has a musical number.

On the 2nd of July 1981, Tony Ferrer's directorial debut the musical film Legs... Katawan... Babae! premiered, it's a film vehicle for the group. The film co-stars Myrna Castillo, Laarni Enriquez, Dinah Dominguez  Val Iglesias, etc. That same year in Lito Lapid's Macho Gigolo, Hagibis performed the theme song.

Group member Sonny Parsons would go on in the film industry as a director and an action star.

The new lineup of Hagibis appeared at the Tonight with Arnold Clavio in 2014 and is still active until today. Original member Fineza died on January 15, 2015, while another original member Parsons passed away on May 10, 2020.

Discography

Albums

Compilations
1994: Katawan
2012: OPM Back to Back Hits (with VST & Co.)

Songs
 "Lalake"
 "Katawan" (1979) (former theme song of the popular comedy show, "Palibhasa Lalake" from 1987 to 1998 on ABS-CBN 2; also covered by Parokya Ni Edgar in 2002's Edgar Edgar Musikahan")
 "Legs" (1979)
 "Babae"
 "Ilagay Mo Kid"
 "Nanggigigil" (1979) (also covered by TNT Boys in 2018 & iDolls in 2021)
 "Mama Monchang"
 "Mandurugas"
 "Maginoo"
 "G.R.O."
 "Hard to Let You Go"
 "A Feeling Just for You"

Filmography

Television Guestings & Cameos
Seeing Stars With Joe Quirino (IBC 13, 1979-1984)
Germside (GMA 7, 1979-1982)
Eat Bulaga (RPN 9, 1979-1989; ABS-CBN 2, 1989-1995; GMA 7, 1995-2019)
Champoy (RPN 9, 1980-1985)
Student Canteen (GMA 7, 1981-1986; RPN 9, 1989-1990)
Germspesyal (GMA 7, 1982-1986)
Superstar Sa 9 (RPN 9, 1985-1995)
The Sharon Cuneta Show (IBC 13, 1986-1988; ABS-CBN 2, 1988-1997)
GMA Supershow (GMA 7, 1986-1997)
Lunch Date (GMA 7, 1986-1993)
Vilma On 7 (GMA 7, 1987-1995)
Sa Linggo nAPO Sila (1989-1995)
Salo Salo Together (1993-1995)
ASAP Natin To (ABS-CBN 2, 1995-2019)
Bubble Gang (GMA 7, 1995-2019)
Super Laff In (ABS-CBN 2, 1996-1997)
SOP: Sobrang Okay Pare (GMA 7, 1997-2010)
Magandang Tanghali Bayan (ABS-CBN 2, 1998-2003)
Esep Esep (ABS-CBN 2, 2000)
Masayang Tanghali Bayan (2003-2004)
MTB Ang Saya Saya (ABS-CBN 2, 2004-2005)
Wowowee (ABS-CBN 2, 2005-2010)
Pilipinas Win Na Win (ABS-CBN 2, 2010)
Showtime (ABS-CBN 2, 2010-2012)
Happy Yipee Yehey (ABS-CBN 2, 2011-2012)
It's Showtime (ABS-CBN 2, 2012-2019)
Sunday All Stars (GMA 7, 2013-2015)
Sunday PinaSaya (GMA 7, 2015-2019)
Wowowin (GMA 7, 2015-2020)
Sabado Badoo (GMA 7, 2015) - cameo footage featured 
Your Face Sounds Familiar PH Kids (ABS-CBN 2, 2018) - cameo photo
Studio 7 (GMA 7, 2018-2019)
All Out Sundays (GMA 7, 2020)
Your Face Sounds Familiar PH (Kapamilya Channel & A2Z 11, 2021) - cameo photo

Movies
1981: Legs, Katawan, Babae

See also
Manila sound

References

Musical groups established in 1979
Filipino boy bands
Musical groups from Metro Manila
Manila sound groups
Star Music artists
Vicor Music artists